Ptereleotris heteroptera is a species of Perciformes in the family Microdesmidae.

References 

heteroptera
Animals described in 1855